Emil Igwenagu (born March 27, 1989) is a former American football fullback. He signed with the Philadelphia Eagles in 2012 as an undrafted free agent. He made his NFL debut on December 13, 2012 against the Cincinnati Bengals, making one tackle on special teams.  He played college football at Massachusetts.

College career
Igwenagu attended the University of Massachusetts where he played both fullback and tight end. He earned all-conference honors during his senior season. At the end of his senior year, Igwenagu was invited to the NFL Scouting Combine. Going into the draft, scouts projected Igwenagu to be taken in the late rounds because he had potential on special teams.

Professional career

Philadelphia Eagles 
Igwenagu was not drafted in the 2012 NFL Draft, but signed as an undrafted free agent with the Philadelphia Eagles. He played multiple positions during the Eagles' training camp, but impressed coaches the most while playing tight end when Brent Celek got injured during camp. On August 31, 2012, Igwenagu was waived. Igwenagu didn't make the team out of camp, but was signed to the practice squad on September 1, 2012. Another injury to Celek allowed Igwenagu to be promoted to the active roster from the practice squad on December 11, 2012.  After Eagles tight end Clay Harbor was placed on injured reserve, Igwenagu and Celek were the only two tight ends on the active roster. Igwenagu made his NFL debut on December 13, 2012. On October 14, 2013, he was waived. On October 16, 2013, Igwenagu was signed to the Eagles' practice squad. He was released by the Eagles on August 23, 2014.

Detroit Lions 
Igwenagu was claimed off waivers by the Detroit Lions on August 25, 2014. He was released by the Detroit Lions on August 30, 2014 during final roster cuts. Igwenagu was signed to the Lions' practice squad on August 31, 2014. On January 6, 2015, Igwenagu signed a reserve/future contract with the Lions. On September 5, 2015, he was waived.

Indianapolis Colts 
On July 19, 2016, Igwenagu signed with the Indianapolis Colts. On August 21, 2016, he was waived by the Colts.

References

External links
Philadelphia Eagles bio
Massachusetts Minutemen bio

1989 births
Living people
Players of American football from Worcester, Massachusetts
American football tight ends
American football fullbacks
UMass Minutemen football players
Philadelphia Eagles players
Detroit Lions players
Indianapolis Colts players